Esperanza is a genus of broad-headed bugs in the family Alydidae. There is at least one described species in Esperanza, E. texana.

References

Further reading

 

Articles created by Qbugbot
Micrelytrinae
Pentatomomorpha genera